Henry VI (IV) the Elder (bef. 1345 – 5 December 1393) was a Duke of Żagań-Głogów since 1368 (with his brothers as co-rulers until 1378).

He was the oldest son of Henry V of Iron, Duke of Żagań-Głogów, by his wife Anna, daughter of Duke Wenceslaus of Płock.

Life
After his father's death in 1369, Henry VI initially ruled jointly with his younger brothers Henry VII Rumpold and Henry VIII the Sparrow. At this time, the Duchy of Żagań was in a tragic financial situation. In order to improve this, Henry V's sons reduced their expenditures to the minimum. Each of them received only 150 fines cash as a rent from the duchy and they only could hold not more than 20 horses. The situation was aggravated also a result of the continued interference of Emperor Charles IV in the internal affairs of the Silesian Duchies. In 1375, following the Emperor's instructions, the main cities of Góra, Głogów and Ścinawa were divided with the Kingdom of Bohemia.

During 1376-1377 Henry VI fell in a sharp conflict with Żagań monasteries, which goods were a rich source of revenue for the Duchy's treasure. In 1378, the Duchy was divided into three parts between the brothers. Henry VI, as the oldest, chose first, taking the most northern part, including the capital, Żagań. The composition of his possessions were also Krosno Odrzańskie, Nowogród Bobrzański and Świebodzin (also, Henry VI used the title of Lord of Żagań and Lubin).

In 1383, together with younger brother Henry VII Rumpold, he made an attempt to recover the town of Wschowa, who was lost by their father. Shortly after the division of the Duchy, the life and political participation of Henry VI in Silesia was clearly narrowing.

On 10 February 1372 Henry VI married with Hedwig (b. ca. 1351 - d. 1 August 1409), daughter of Duke Wenceslaus I of Legnica. The union wasn't successful, and after the premature death of their only daughter, they became separated: Hedwig remained in Żagań and Henry VI moved to Krosno Odrzańskie. Despite this, Henry VI left his wife all his lands as her dower in his will.

During his stay in Krosno Odrzańskie, Henry VI devoted himself to contemplation and asceticism. He was the only of Henry V's sons who reconciled with the Żagań monasteries' Orders.

Henry VI died on 5 December 1393 in Włoszczowa, a village near the Lubin County. He was buried in the Augustinian church in Żagań. His widow Hedwig ruled over Żagań, Krosno Odrzańskie and Świebodzin until 1403, when she finally gave the lands to the sons of the youngest brother of Henry VI, Henry VIII the Sparrow.

References

Genealogical database by Herbert Stoyan
This article was translated from his original in Polish Wikipedia.

|-

|-

1340s births
1393 deaths
Dukes of Żagań